John William "Bud" Rogan ( 1867 – September 11, 1905; some sources indicate 1867, 1868 and 1871 as his birth year) is recorded as the second-tallest person ever at , behind only Robert Wadlow.

Biography

John Rogan was born in Hendersonville, Tennessee. He was the son of the former slave William Rogan, as the fourth of twelve children. His rapid growth began at the age of 13, due to gigantism. This led to ankylosis (an abnormal rigidity of the skeletal joints). By 1882, he could not stand or walk.

Although unable to perform physical labor due to his condition, Rogan made a living by selling portraits and postcards at a train station. An 1897 article in the Kansas City Journal mentions that a number of his drawings were published. He declined all offers to join carnivals and sideshows.

He used a goat-pulled cart like a wheelchair and was always the center of attention, often noted for his deep voice and playful attitude.

Rogan's hands measured  in length and his feet measured  in length. Around the time of his death he measured 8 ft 9 in. He was the tallest person of African descent and the second tallest person on record. Robert Wadlow's height surpassed Rogan's in 1939. A newspaper article said his maternal grandfather was also a giant, requiring a larger saddle when he rode horses, hinting at a possible genetic inheritance.

Rogan died on September 11, 1905. The area of his current burial point is believed to be on the old Rogana farm lands. Evidence suggests that he was in fact buried there as previous rumors suggest they took him back to their place after his death and buried him in an unmarked grave, covering him in a cement vault.

See also
 List of tallest people

References

1870s births
1905 deaths
African-American people
Burials in Tennessee
People from Hendersonville, Tennessee
People with gigantism